Parhelophilus versicolor is a European hoverfly.

Description
External images
For terms see Morphology of Diptera Wing length is 7–9 mm. There is no posteroventral tubercle at base of Femur 3. Face is convex. Occiput has yellow hairs only. Reemer (2000) figures the male genitalia. The larva is  figured by Hartley (1961)     
See references for determination.

Distribution
Palearctic Southern Fennoscandia South to Iberia and the Mediterranean basin. Ireland East through Europe into Turkey and European Russia then to western Siberia.

Biology
Habitat: Wetland. Fen, marsh and reed beds. Flowers visited include white umbellifers, Aegopodium podagraria, Cardamine, Cistus, Crataegus, Euphorbia, Filipendula ulmaria, Galium, Leontodon, Sorbus aucuparia. Flies May to August. The larva is aquatic. It has been collected from decaying rhizomes of Typha.

References

Diptera of Europe
Eristalinae
Insects described in 1787
Taxa named by Johan Christian Fabricius